Raaste Pyar Ke ( Route of Love) is a 1982 Hindi-language romance film, produced and directed by V. B. Rajendra Prasad under his Jagapathi Art Productions banner. It stars Jeetendra, Rekha and Shabana Azmi with music composed by Laxmikant–Pyarelal. A love triangle, the film is a remake of the Telugu blockbuster movie Dasara Bullodu (1971), made by the same company and director.

Plot 
Mohanlal Srivatsav is a plucky reared by his elder brother Sohanlal and sister-in-law Yashoda. Municipal Chairman Dwarka Prasad is the paternal uncle who separated from them on the provocation of his virago wife Saraswati. Mohan runs a mechanic shed opposite the house of devious & materialistic Udit Narayan Gupta who efforts to remove the shed but fails. However, his benevolent daughter Shyama loves Mohanlal but he is already in love with Shyama’s best friend Gauri. Just after tragically, Shyama is diagnosed with cancer when she also realises the love of Mohanlal & Gauri and sacrifices her. Now Udit Narayan conspires to knit Shyama with Mohanlal in a hope of her survival because she idolizes Mohanlal. Hence, he lures Saraswati and splits Mohan from his brother as they have adopted him in childhood. Future, he threatens Gauri to discard which she agrees owing to Shyama’s condition and decides to marry Suldev one that adores her. Here, Udit Narayan intrigues by setting fire to the venue when Mohan rescues them. Finally, the movie ends Shyama happily breathes her last, uniting Mohanlal & Gauri.

Cast 
Jeetendra as Mohanlal Shrivatsav
Rekha as Gauri
Shabana Azmi as Shyama
Shreeram Lagoo as Dwarka Prasad
Utpal Dutt as Udit Narayan Gupta
Parikshit Sahni as Sohanlal Shrivastav
Om Puri as Suldev
Yunus Parvez as Seetaram
Mazhar Khan
Nadira as Saraswati
Ashalata Wabgaonkar as Laxmi
Shaukat Kaifi
Baby Khushbu as Anu

Reception
Subhash K. Jha calls it "a typical South Indian masala-dosa film about two warring women sharing the same man".

Soundtrack

References

External links 
 

1980s Hindi-language films
1982 films
1982 romantic drama films
Films directed by V. B. Rajendra Prasad
Films scored by Laxmikant–Pyarelal
Hindi remakes of Telugu films
Indian romantic drama films